Cirrhinus jullieni is a species of ray-finned fish in the genus Cirrhinus. Many authorities regard C. jullieni as a synonym of Cirrhinus molitorella.

References

Fish of Thailand
Cirrhinus
Fish described in 1878